RMS Fenella may refer to:

Ships 
 SS Fenella (1881) A twin-screw Packet Steamer operated by the Isle of Man Steam Packet Company. Disposed of in 1929.
 SS Fenella (1936) A turbine steamer operated by the Isle of Man Steam Packet Company. Sunk during the Dunkirk Evacuation, 29 May 1940.
 MV Fenella (1951) A motor cargo vessel operated by the Isle of Man Steam Packet Company. Sold to Greek interests,  subsequently caught fire and sank in the Mediterranean on 2 February 1977.